In the 1845 Iowa Territory Council elections, electors selected councilors to serve in the eighth and final Iowa Territory Council before Iowa attained statehood in 1846. All 13 members of the Territory Council were elected. Councilors served until the organization of the Iowa General Assembly in 1846 as the legislative branch of the new state of Iowa.

The Iowa Territory existed from July 4, 1838, until December 28, 1846, when Iowa was admitted to the Union as a state. At the time, the Iowa Territory had a Legislative Assembly consisting of an upper chamber (i.e., the Territory Council) and a lower chamber (i.e., the Territory House of Representatives). Since statehood in 1846, the General Assembly has served as the legislative branch of Iowa. The Territory Council was the predecessor to the Iowa State Senate, the upper chamber of the Iowa state legislature.

Following the previous election in 1844, Democrats held a majority with 11 seats to Whigs' two seats.

To claim a majority of seats, the Whigs needed to net five seats from Democrats.

The Democrats maintained a majority of seats in the Council following the 1845 general election with the balance of power remaining unchanged with Democrats holding 11 seats and Whigs having two seats. Democratic Councilor Stephen P. Hempstead was chosen as the President of the eighth Territory Council to succeed Democratic Councilor Serranus Clinton Hastings in that leadership position.

Summary of Results 

Source:

Detailed Results
NOTE: The Iowa General Assembly does not contain detailed vote totals for Territory Council elections in 1845.

See also
 Elections in Iowa

External links
District boundaries for the Iowa Territory Council in 1845:
Iowa Territory Council Districts 1845-1846 map

References

Iowa Council
Iowa
Iowa Senate elections